Outlaws is the debut studio album by American southern rock band Outlaws, released in 1975. The album is known for the rock classic "Green Grass & High Tides", which is considered by many to be one of the greatest  guitar songs, plus the hit single "There Goes Another Love Song". A cover version of "Green Grass & High Tides" appears as a playable song in the video game Rock Band.

Drawing influences from southern rock bands The Allman Brothers & Lynyrd Skynyrd, as well as folk rock and country rock bands such as The Byrds, Poco, Eagles, and New Riders of the Purple Sage, the band developed a unique, hard-driving country rock sound, due in part to the fast picking, quasi-country style guitar playing of Hughie Thomasson, coupled with their use of three and four part harmonies and incorporation of elements of bluegrass music.

The band was also notable for featuring three different front men: Thomasson, Henry Paul, and Billy Jones, all of whom wrote and provided lead vocals. Paul's vocals and his self-penned tracks "Song in the Breeze", "Stay with Me" and "Knoxville Girl" brought a strong country flavor to the album, while Jones teamed with Thomasson to provide a hard driving Southern Rock guitar sound focused on dueling guitar lines.

The album, with its blend of Southern rock, country rock and hard rock, was well received by critics, and also helped the band become a huge concert draw. It peaked at #13 on the Billboard 200.

Meaning of "Green Grass and High Tides"
For years it was thought by many that "Green Grass & High Tides" was about marijuana, but according to writer Hughie Thomasson that is not the case at all. He once stated that it is about all his dead rock star favorites like Jimi Hendrix, Janis Joplin, Jim Morrison, Duane Allman and more coming back and playing a show just for him. The song's title is based on that of the 1966 Rolling Stones compilation Big Hits (High Tide and Green Grass). Henry Paul once referred to the lyrics as Alice In Wonderland-like, while giving praise to Thomasson's creative songwriting.

Track listing

Personnel
Outlaws
Hughie Thomasson – lead guitar, vocals
Billy Jones – lead guitar, vocals
Monte Yoho – drums
Frank O'Keefe – bass guitar
Henry Paul – electric and acoustic guitar, vocals

Others
J.D. Souther – harmonies on "It Follows From Your Heart"

Charts

Singles

Notes

External links
 Outlaws

Outlaws (band) albums
1975 debut albums
Albums produced by Paul A. Rothchild
Arista Records albums